Gary John Barden (born 27 August 1955, Royal Tunbridge Wells, England) is an English singer-songwriter, best known for his work with Michael Schenker Group.

Barden was discovered by Schenker upon the guitarist's hearing a demo of Barden's previous band, Fraser Nash. Barden proceeded to appear on The Michael Schenker Group (1980), MSG (1981) and One Night at Budokan (1981) albums. He was asked to leave the group and was replaced briefly by former Rainbow frontman Graham Bonnet. In the interim, Barden worked with Gary Moore on the demos of what would later become Moore's Corridors of Power album and joined MSG again to conclude the band's tour after Bonnet's departure and recorded the next album Built to Destroy (1983), and the live album Rock Will Never Die (1984). After his stint in MSG he went on to form Statetrooper with brothers Steve and Paul Johnson, as well as record an album and tour as lead singer with Praying Mantis.

In 2007, Barden was fronting Silver and Statetrooper, and maintaining a solo career. He recorded an album with Michael Schenker Group called In the Midst of Beauty which was released in April 2008, followed by a world tour. In 2010, Barden, Schenker, Simon Philips, Neil Murray and Wayne Findlay embarked in an extensive tour in Japan, recording a new DVD to celebrate the 30th Anniversary of their debut album. After that, Barden left the band amicably to focus in his solo career. He rejoined Michael Schenker to record an album entitled Michael Schenker Fest, which was a collection of MSG's former singers to record new songs.  Following the album's release, he and the rest of the group embarked on a world tour.

Barden currently resides in Bangkok, Thailand.

Discography

with The Michael Schenker Group
 The Michael Schenker Group (1980)
 MSG (1981)
 One Night at Budokan (1982)
 Built to Destroy (1983)
 Rock Will Never Die (1984)
 Heavy Hitters (2005)
 Tales of Rock'n'Roll (2006)
 In the Midst of Beauty (2008)

with Schenker Barden Acoustic Project
 Gipsy Lady (2009)

with Praying Mantis
 To the Power of Ten (1995)
 Captured Alive in Tokyo City (1996)

with Statetrooper
 Statetrooper (1986)
 The Calling (2004)

with Silver
 Silver (2001)
 Dream Machines (2002)
 Intruder (2003)
 Addiction (2004)
 Gold (2005)

Solo as Gary John Barden
 Past & Present (MSG remixed) (2004)
 Agony & The Xtasy (2006)
 Love and War  (2007)
 Rock 'n Roll My Soul  (2010)
 Eleventh Hour  (2011)

Michael Schenkerfest
  Resurrection (2018)
  Revelation (2019)

References

1955 births
Living people
English rock singers
English heavy metal singers
English rock guitarists
English male singer-songwriters
Michael Schenker Group members
The Gary Moore Band members
People from Royal Tunbridge Wells
Musicians from Royal Tunbridge Wells
Musicians from Kent
English male guitarists
The Company of Snakes members